Dorothy Wright Nelson (born September 30, 1928) is a senior United States circuit judge of the United States Court of Appeals for the Ninth Circuit.

Education and career
Born in San Pedro, California, Wright received an Artium Baccalaureus degree from the University of California, Los Angeles in 1950, a Juris Doctor from UCLA School of Law in 1953, and a Master of Laws from the USC Gould School of Law in 1956. She was a research associate fellow at the Gould School of Law from 1953 to 1956. She was in private practice in Los Angeles, California from 1954 to 1957. She was a member of the faculty of the Gould School of Law from 1957 to 1980. She was an instructor from 1957 to 1958. She was an assistant professor from 1958 to 1961. She was an associate professor from 1961 to 1967. She was an associate dean from 1965 to 1967. She was an interim dean from 1967 to 1969 and because of her achievement she was named Woman of the Year by Time magazine. She was a professor from 1967 to 1980. She was a dean from 1969 to 1980. She was an adjunct professor of law at the Gould School of Law starting 1980.

Federal judicial service
Nelson was nominated by President Jimmy Carter on September 28, 1979, to the United States Court of Appeals for the Ninth Circuit, to a new seat created by 92 Stat. 1629. She was confirmed by the United States Senate on December 19, 1979, and received her commission on December 20, 1979. She assumed senior status on January 1, 1995. She published an article in the Southern California Law Review. She is the author of a book, Judicial Administration and the Administration of Justice, published by West Lawbook.

Supreme Court consideration
In 1973 there was discussion she might be nominated to the US Supreme Court in the news.

Personal life
In 1950, Wright married James F. Nelson (1927–2011), a longtime Los Angeles Municipal Court judge. The couple had two children.

She is an active member of the Baháʼí Faith and served in the National Spiritual Assembly of the Baháʼís of United States for many years. She became a Baháʼí following the suggestion to explore the religion from Donald Barrett in 1954 along with about 70 others across a decade. Barrett would go on to serve at the Baháʼí World Center in 1979. In 1989, she was awarded an honorary Doctor of Laws (LL.D.) degree from Whittier College.

References

External links
 
 
 
 
 
 
 
 
 
 

1928 births
20th-century American judges
21st-century Bahá'ís
American Bahá'ís
Judges of the United States Court of Appeals for the Ninth Circuit
Living people
United States court of appeals judges appointed by Jimmy Carter
University of California, Los Angeles alumni
UCLA School of Law alumni
USC Gould School of Law alumni
Deans of law schools in the United States
Women deans (academic)
USC Gould School of Law faculty
American academic administrators
American women legal scholars
20th-century American women judges